Gamehendge is the fictional setting for a number of songs by the rock band Phish. Most of the songs can be traced back to The Man Who Stepped Into Yesterday (or TMWSIY), the senior project of guitarist and primary vocalist Trey Anastasio, written while he attended Goddard College in 1987. The recording of TMWSIY has been heavily circulated among fans and is considered by some to be an unreleased Phish album.  Outside of the songs from TMWSIY, there are numerous other songs set in the fictional universe of Gamehendge.

Story
The Gamehendge saga, as told on The Man Who Stepped Into Yesterday album, tells the story of Colonel Forbin, a retired colonel from Long Island, New York, who enters the land of Gamehendge and rescues a document called the Helping Friendly Book from an evil dictator named Wilson.

Characters from Gamehendge
The Lizards (the race of people who inhabit Gamehendge and are dependent upon the writings of the Helping Friendly Book for their survival. They're a race of people practically extinct from doing things smart people don't do.)
Wilson (a traveller who arrives in Gamehendge and eventually captures the Helping Friendly Book from the Lizards and locks it in the top of his castle, thus becoming the sole dictator of Gamehendge)
Colonel Forbin (a retired colonel who embarks on a mission to rescue the Helping Friendly Book from the tower of Wilson's castle)
McGrupp (Colonel Forbin's dog)
Rutherford the Brave (head knight of the Lizards who leads a team of allies to help overthrow Wilson)
Tela (member of the allies and Colonel Forbin's object of desire who is eventually revealed as a spy for Wilson)
Errand Wolfe (member of the allies who keeps the book for himself after overthrowing Wilson instead of returning it to the Lizards, thus declaring himself ruler)
Roger Wolfe (member of the allies, Errand's son. Hanged by Wilson in the public square on suspicion of treason.)
Mr. Palmer (Wilson's accountant who is hanged by the AC/DC Bag in the town square after he is caught embezzling money to fund the allies)
The AC/DC Bag (a robotic hangman with a bag on its head used to hang traitors and enemies of Wilson)
The Unit Monster (a giant monster who is a member of the allies and is killed along with Tela for spying)
Spotted Stripers (Three-legged messenger birds sent by Tela the spy to reveal information to Wilson about the activities of the allies)
Multibeasts (giant four-legged creatures that are used as transportation by the people of Gamehendge, much like horses or camels. They have long curly hair and splotches of brown and white color.)
The Famous Mockingbird (a bird who is sent by Icculus to fly to the very top of Wilson's castle and retrieve the Helping Friendly Book for Colonel Forbin)
The Sloth (a hitman who is hired to murder Wilson after the Helping Friendly Book is rescued)
Icculus (the Supreme God of the Sky and author of the Helping Friendly Book)
Llamas (giant animals used by the Lizards in combat; complete with huge guns on each side)
Jimmy (young resident of Gamehendge)
Poster Nutbag (The cat owned by Jimmy; always dies some form of death towards the end of the song 'Harpua', an ever-changing narration sometimes taking place in Gamehendge)
Harpua (A mean bulldog owned by an old man who was banished from Jimmy's village; invariably ends up in a terrible fight with Poster Nutbag, usually resulting in Poster's death, sometimes set in Gamehendge.)

Songs from Gamehendge
Songs from The Man Who Stepped into Yesterday
The Man Who Stepped into Yesterday (The introduction features the story's main theme music as the narrator describes the lonely life of Colonel Forbin and what happens when he begins to see an image of a strange door on a daily basis)
The Lizards (Colonel Forbin, while on a walk with his "fleet hound called McGrupp", decides to finally walk through the door, thus entering the land of Gamehendge. The song features Colonel Forbin hearing tales about the saga of the Lizards, Wilson, and the Helping Friendly Book as told by native Rutherford the Brave)
Tela (Colonel Forbin joins Rutherford and other allies, one of whom is the beautiful Tela. The song reveals Colonel Forbin's deep feelings for Tela)
Wilson (a song introducing the evil king Wilson, who captured the Helping Friendly Book from the Lizards and declared himself ruler of Gamehendge)
AC/DC Bag (tells the story of the execution of Mr. Palmer, Wilson's accountant. Palmer was using Wilson's money to secretly fund the revolution, and was therefore hanged in the town square by the AC/DC Bag, a mechanical hangman)
Colonel Forbin's Ascent (details Colonel Forbin's journey to the top of a giant mountain to ask for the help of Icculus, the Supreme God of the Sky, in regaining the Helping Friendly Book, which Icculus wrote, from Wilson)
Fly Famous Mockingbird (Icculus sends his friend, the Famous Mockingbird, to retrieve the Helping Friendly Book from Wilson's Castle)
The Sloth (once the book is recovered, the Sloth is hired by the allies to murder Wilson)
Possum (a non-Gamehendge song written by original Phish guitarist Jeff Holdsworth and later entered into the story by Anastasio with altered lyrics to fit the Gamehendge theme. It offers a strange moral: Icculus considers all that's happened in Gamehendge, offers a slogan to consider ("ain't no truth in action unless you believe it anyway") and describes the roadside demise of a possum. Aside from "Col. Forbin's Ascent," this is Icculus's only direct speech in the Gamehendge saga.)

Other Gamehendge songs
Divided Sky (a chant performed by the Lizards as they stand on the edge of a rhombus and shout to the sky, praising Icculus)
Llama (a tale from the later years of Wilson's reign in Gamehendge during a violent war)
McGrupp and the Watchful Hosemasters (the story of a shepherd who lives in Gamehendge, whose flock is watched over by Colonel Forbin's dog, McGrupp. This was originally a poem that inspired the Gamehendge saga, then grafted onto the music from a song that Trey wrote with his mother entitled Skippy The Wondermouse which was performed live until 1985.)
Punch You in the Eye (tells the story of a traveller who passes through Gamehendge during Wilson's reign and his subsequent escape from Wilson's jail)
Icculus (introduces Icculus, the Supreme God of the Sky and author of the Helping Friendly Book, a text which is revered by the Lizards)
Harpua (tells the story of a mean bulldog who sometimes lives in Gamehendge, however not all Harpua narration sequences include Gamehendge)
Axilla (a tale of monsters, witches, and battles in old time Gamehendge)
Axilla, Part 2 (told years later during peacetime in Gamehendge as the narrator reflects on the land's past turmoil)
Kung (a chant that one must perform in order to enter the land of Gamehendge)
Esther and Reba have also been mentioned as possible Gamehendge characters, especially Esther who Trey Anastasio has said hails from a part of Gamehendge. The "flying jam" in Esther also appears as the interlude between several of the TMWSIY songs lending said songs a thematic, musical link.

Character and location references
In the story, "Prussia" is a city that was constructed in the land of Gamehendge. In the song "Wilson," Anastasio refers to Wilson as the "King of Prussia." This lyric references an actual city named King of Prussia, Pennsylvania, which is where "the rhombus" was rumored to be located. Actually located near Anastasio's childhood home in Princeton, New Jersey, the rhombus is a giant piece of art located in a field where Anastasio, Phish lyricist Tom Marshall, and other friends would engage in lengthy songwriting sessions (including some Gamehendge songs). "The Divided Sky" also references the rhombus, where the Lizards supposedly chant to the sky in praise of Icculus.
The Roger Holloway song "Mr. Richburg's Lullaby" also references more of Anastasio's friends, including Mike Christian, Holloway ("Roger Wolfe" in the story, also immortalized in "AC/DC Bag"), and drummer Pete Cottone. Anastasio and Holloway perform the instrumental duet "Aftermath" on the very first Phish album, which also features Pete Cottone on drums for "Slave to the Traffic Light."
Dave Abrahms, an old friend and songwriting collaborator of Anastasio's, is referenced in "McGrupp and the Watchful Hosemasters."

Live performances
The songs from Gamehendge have been played many times throughout the career of Phish, sometimes with Anastasio narrating parts of the story to the audience. The earliest known performance of a Gamehendge song was "McGrupp and the Watchful Hosemasters" on April 6, 1985, in Burlington, Vermont. On the following four occasions in the band's history, Phish performed a complete set of Gamehendge songs, complete with narration:

 1988-03-12
 1993-03-22
 1994-06-26
 1994-07-08

On 1991-10-13, Phish played an almost complete Narration, leaving off "The Lizards".

The July 8, 1994 concert is the only complete Gamehendge performance to have been issued by the band as an official live release. It was first featured as part of their Dinner and a Movie webcast series in July 2020, and was made available on their LivePhish website the next month. The July 1994 concert had been recorded by Boston public television station WGBH.

Each song list has been slightly different from one another. The 1994 shows were recorded in 24-track digital for, it is assumed, a CD-ROM project that was mentioned in a 1994 Doniac Schvice. The project has long since been shelved.

Another common sequence at shows from 1988 to 1995, and less frequently after, was to play Colonel Forbin's Ascent segueing into Fly Famous Mockingbird, often with an Anastasio monologue sandwiched in between.

When songs from the project are performed live, accompanying narration often details the transportation of the audience to Gamehendge. Some fans speak of "going to Gamehendge" with reference to attending a Phish concert. Some songs and narratives explain how to get to Gamehendge, as evident in live versions of "Kung," "Harpua," "N02," and "It's Ice."

See also
 The Man Who Stepped Into Yesterday

References

External links
http://music.ibiblio.org/pub/multimedia/jamz/SBDs/trey-gamehendge.shnf/ Lossless SHN download of TMWSIY(Gamehendge)
http://www.phish.net/faq/gamehendge.html Phish.net's explanation of Gamehendge
https://mega.nz/#F!rj50WIyb!cp-v95RRtoKwWELjibAMFw A free download of a compilation of 100 artists that reworked Gamehendge for Little Fury Things Records.
https://drive.google.com/file/d/0B1Wtg8bQou2eNTZRZFRZR1RlN3c/edit Trey's Gamehendge senior thesis.
https://phish.com/news/daam-ep19/

Phish
Fictional locations